Marion Township is one of the fourteen townships of Mercer County, Ohio, United States.  The 2000 census found 2,969 people in the township, 2,605 of whom lived in the unincorporated portions of the township.

Geography
Located in the southeastern corner of the county, it borders the following townships:
Franklin Township - north
German Township, Auglaize County - northeast
Jackson Township, Auglaize County - east
McLean Township, Shelby County - southeast corner
Patterson Township, Darke County - southeast
Wabash Township, Darke County - southwest
Granville Township - west
Butler Township - northwest

The village of Chickasaw is located in northern Marion Township, and the unincorporated communities of Cassella, St. Rose, Maria Stein, and Sebastian lie in the western, central, and northwestern portions of the township respectively.  Marion Local Schools and the historic Roman Catholic convent of the Sisters of the Precious Blood and the Shrine of the Holy Relics are located in Maria Stein.

Name and history
It is one of twelve Marion Townships statewide.

Government
The township is governed by a three-member board of trustees, who are elected in November of odd-numbered years to a four-year term beginning on the following January 1. Two are elected in the year after the presidential election and one is elected in the year before it. There is also an elected township fiscal officer, who serves a four-year term beginning on April 1 of the year after the election, which is held in November of the year before the presidential election. Vacancies in the fiscal officership or on the board of trustees are filled by the remaining trustees.

References

External links

County website

Townships in Mercer County, Ohio
Townships in Ohio